Kozlovka (Kuslavkka) is a town and the administrative center of Kozlovsky District of the Chuvash Republic, Russia, located on the right bank of the Volga River, near the borders with the Mari El Republic and the Republic of Tatarstan. Population:

History
The first settlement on the place of modern town was founded in 1671. Kozlovka was granted urban-type settlement status in 1938 and town status on November 20, 1967.

Administrative and municipal status
Within the framework of administrative divisions, Kozlovka serves as the administrative center of Kozlovsky District. As an administrative division, it is, together with three rural localities, incorporated within Kozlovsky District as Kozlovskoye Urban Settlement. As a municipal division, this administrative unit also has urban settlement status and is a part of Kozlovsky Municipal District.

References

Notes

Sources

External links
Official website of Kozlovskoye Urban Settlement 
Unofficial website of Kozlovka 

Cities and towns in Chuvashia